The Mongol campaign against the Nizaris of the Alamut period (the Nizari Ismaili state) began in 1253 after the Mongol invasion of the Khwarazmian Empire and a series of Nizari–Mongol conflicts. The campaign was ordered by the Great Khan Möngke and was led by his brother, Hülegü. The campaign against the Nizaris and later the Abbasid Caliphate was intended to establish a new khanate in the region—the Ilkhanate.

Hülegü's campaign began with attacks on strongholds in Quhistan and Qumis amidst intensified internal dissensions among Nizari leaders under Imam Muhammad III of Alamut whose policy was fighting against the Mongols. His successor, Rukn al-Din Khurshah, began a long series of negotiations in face of the implacable Mongol advance. In 1256, the Imam capitulated while besieged in Maymun-Diz and ordered his followers to do likewise according to his agreement with Hülegü. Despite being difficult to capture, Alamut ceased hostilities too and was dismantled. The Nizari state was thus disestablished, although several individual forts, notably Lambsar, Gerdkuh, and those in Syria continued to resist. Möngke Khan later ordered a general massacre of all Nizaris, including Khurshah and his family.

Many of the surviving Nizaris scattered throughout Western, Central, and South Asia. Little is known about them afterward, but their communities maintain some sort of independence in their heartland of Daylam and their Imamate reappear later in Anjudan.

Sources
The main primary source is Tarikh-i Jahangushay written by the historian Ata-Malik Juvayni, who was present in the campaign as an official under Hulegu. Juvayni has dedicated the concluding one-third of his history to this campaign, depicting it as the pinnacle of the Mongol conquest in the Muslim lands. His account contains inconsistencies and exaggerations and has been "corrected" based on other sources. Other sources include Jami' al-Tawarikh written by Rashid al-Din Hamadani and Tarikh-i Tabaristan.

Background

The Nizaris were a branch of Ismailis, itself a branch of Shia Muslims. By establishing strategic and self-sufficient mountain strongholds, they had established a state of their own within the territories of the Seljuq and later Khwarezmian empires of Persia.

In 1192 or 1193, Rashid al-Din Sinan had been succeeded by the Persian da'i Nasr al-Ajami, who restored Alamut suzerainty over the Nizaris in Syria. After the Mongol invasion of Persia, many Sunni and Shia Muslims (including the prominent scholar al-Tusi) had taken refuge with the Nizaris of Quhistan. The governor (muhtasham) of Quhistan was Nasir al-Din Abu al-Fath Abd al-Rahim ibn Abi Mansur.

Early Nizari–Mongol relations

In 1221, the Nizari Imam Jalal al-Din Hasan sent emissaries to Genghis Khan in Balkh. The Imam died in the same year and was succeeded by his 9-years-old son, Ala al-Din Muhammad.

After the fall of the Khwarezmian dynasty as a result of the Mongol invasion, direct confrontation began between the Nizaris under Imam Ala al-Din Muhammad and the Mongols under Ögedei Khan. The latter had just begun to conquer the rest of Persia. Soon the Nizaris lost Damghan in Qumis to the Mongols; the Nizaris had recently taken control of the city after the fall of the Khwarezmshahs.

The Nizari Imam sought anti-Mongol alliances as far as China, France, and England: in 1238, he and the Abbasid caliph Al-Mustansir sent a joint diplomatic mission to the European kings Louis IX of France and Edward I of England to forge a Muslim–Christian alliance against the Mongols, but this was unsuccessful. The European kings later joined the Mongols against the Muslims.

In 1246, the Nizari Imam, together with the new Abbasid caliph Al-Musta'sim and many Muslim rulers, sent a diplomatic mission under Nizari muhtashams (governor) of Quhistan Shihab al-Din and Shams al-Din to Mongolia on the occasion of the enthronement of the new Mongol Great Khan, Güyük Khan; but the latter dismissed it, and soon dispatched reinforcements under Eljigidei to Persia, instructing him to dedicate one-fifth of the forces there to reduce rebellious territories, beginning with the Nizari state. Güyük himself had intended to participate but died shortly afterward. A Mongol noyan (commander), Chagatai the Elder, was reportedly assassinated by the Nizaris around this time.

Güyük's successor, Möngke Khan, began to implement the former's schemes. Möngke's decision followed anti-Nizari urges by Sunnis in the Mongol court, new anti-Nizari complaints (such as that of Shams al-Din, qadi of Qazvin), and warnings from local Mongol commanders in Persia. In 1252, Möngke entrusted the mission of conquering the rest of Western Asia to his brother Hülegü, with the highest priority being the conquest of the Nizari state and the Abbasid Caliphate. Elaborate preparations were made, and Hülegü did not set out until 1253, and actually arrived in Persia more than two years later.  In 1253, William of Rubruck, a Flemish priest sent on a mission to Karakorum in Mongolia, was struck by the security precautions there, reportedly in response to the more than forty assassins who had been sent there to assassinate Möngke; it is possible that the assassination attempt was merely rumored.

Hülegü's campaign

Campaign against Quhistan, Qumis, and Khurasan

In March 1253, Hülegü's advance guard under command of Kitbuqa crossed Oxus (Amu Darya) with 12,000 men (one tümen plus two mingghans under Köke Ilgei). In April 1253, they captured several Nizari fortresses in Quhistan and killed their inhabitants, and in May they attacked the district Qumis and laid siege to Gerdkuh, the main Nizari stronghold there. His army comprised 5,000 (probably Mongol) cavalrymen and 5,000 (probably Tajik) infantrymen. Kitbuqa left an army under amir Büri to besiege Gerdkuh, and himself attacked the nearby Mihrin (Mehrnegar) castle and Shah (in Qasran?). In August 1253, he sent raiding parties to Tarem and Rudbar districts with little results. Afterward they attacked and slaughtered the inhabitants of Mansuriah and Alabeshin (Alah beshin).

In October 1253, Hülegü left his orda in Mongolia and began his march with a tümen at a leisurely pace and increased his number in his way. He was accompanied by two of his ten sons, Abaqa and Yoshmut, his brother Subedei, who died en route, his wives Öljei and Yisut, and his stepmother Doquz.

In July 1253, Kitbuqa who had been in Quhistan, pillaged, slaughtered, and seized probably temporarily Tun (Ferdows) and Turshiz. A few months later, Mehrin and several other castles in Qumis fell as well. In December 1253, Girdkuh's garrison audaciously sallied at night and killed a hundred Mongols, including Büri. Gerdkuh was on the verge of falling due to an outbreak of cholera, but, unlike Lambsar, it survived the epidemic and was saved by the arrival of reinforcements from Alamut sent by the Imam Ala al-Din Muhammad in the summer of 1254. The impregnable fort resisted for many years (see below).

In September 1255, Hülegü arrived near Samarqand.
He then made Kish (Shahrisabz) his temporary headquarters, and sent messengers to the local Mongol and non-Mongol rulers in Persia, announcing his presence as the Great Khan's viceroy and asking for assistance against the Nizaris, with the punishment of refusal being their utter destruction. In Autumn 1255, Arghun Aqa joined him. All of the rulers of Rum (Anatolia), Fars, Iraq, Azerbaijan, Arran, Shirvan, Georgia, and supposedly also Armenia, acknowledged their service with many gifts.

The inexorable Mongol advances in Quhistan caused consternation among the Nizari leadership. The relationship had already deteriorated between Imam Ala al-Din Muhammad, who was reportedly afflicted by melancholia, and his advisors and Nizari leaders, as well as with his son Rukn al-Din Khurshah, the designated future Imam. According to Persian historians, the Nizari elites had planned a "coup" against Muhammad in order to replace him with Khurshah who would subsequently enter into immediate negotiations with the Mongols, but Khurshah fell ill before implementing this plan. Nevertheless, on December 1 or 2, 1255, Muhammad died under suspicious circumstances and was succeeded by Khurshah who was in his late twenties.

To reach Iran, Hülegü entered via the Chaghatai khaganate, crossing Oxus (Amu Darya) in January 1256 and entered Quhistan in April 1256. Hülegü chose Tun, which had not been reduced effectively by Kitbuqa, as his first target. An obscure incident occurred while Hülegü was passing the Zawa and Khwaf districts which deterred him from supervising the campaign. He instructed Kitbuqa and Köke Ilgei in May 1256 to attack Tun again, which was sacked after a week-long siege, and almost all its inhabitants were massacred. The Mongol commanders then regrouped with Hülegü and attacked Tus.

Campaign against Rudbar and Alamut

As soon as he had been in power, Khurshah announced the Nizari leadership's willingness to submit to the Mongol rule to the nearest Mongol commander, noyan Yasur in Qazvin. Yasur replied that the Imam personally should visit Hülegü's camp. Fightings are recorded between Yasur and the Nizaris of Rudbar: on June 12, he was defeated in a battle on Mount Siyalan near Alamut, where the Nizari forces had been mustered, but managed to harass the Nizaris of the region.

As Hülegü reached Bistam, his army had enlarged into five tümens, and new commanders were added. Many of them were the relatives of Batu Khan. From the ulus of Jochi representing the Golden Horde came Quli (son of Orda), Balagha, and Tutar. Chagatai Khanate forces were under Tegüder. A contingent of Oirat tribesmen also joined under Buqa Temür. No member of Ögedei's family is mentioned. Hülegü had with him a thousand squads of siege engineers (probably north Chinese, Khitan and Muslim) skilled in the use of mangonels and naphtha.

The Mongols campaigned against the Nizari heartland of Alamut and Rudbar from three directions. The right wing, under Buqa Temür and Köke Ilgei, marched via Tabaristan. The left wing, under Tegüder and Kitbuqa, marched via Khuwar and Semnan. The center was under Hulegu himself. Meanwhile, Hülegü sent another warning to Khurshah. Khurshah was in Maymun-Diz fortress and was apparently playing for time; by resisting longer, the arrival of winter could have stopped the Mongol campaigning. He sent his vizier Kayqubad; they met the Mongols in Firuzkuh and offered the surrender of all strongholds except Alamut and Lambsar, and again asked for a year's delay for Khurshah to visit Hülegü in person. Meanwhile, Khurshah ordered Gerdkuh and fortresses of Quhistan to surrender, which their chiefs did, but the garrison of Gerdkuh continued to resist. The Mongols continued to advance and reached Lar, Damavand, and Shahdiz. Khurshah sent his 7- or 8-years-old son as a show of good faith, but he was sent back due to his young age. Khurshah then sent his second brother Shahanshah (Shahin Shah), who met the Mongols at Rey. But Hülegü demanded the dismantling of the Nizari fortifications to show his goodwill.

Numerous negotiations between the Nizari Imam and Hülegü were futile. Apparently, the Nizari Imam sought to at least keep the main Nizari strongholds, while the Mongols were adamant that the Nizaris must fully submit.

Siege of Maymun-Diz

On 8 November 1256, Hülegü set a camp on a hilltop facing Maymun-Diz and encircled the fortress with his forces by marching over the Alamut mountains via Taleqan valley and appearing at the foot of Maymun-Diz.

Maymun-Diz could have been attacked by mangonels; that was not the case with Alamut, Nevisar Shah, Lambsar and Gerdkuh, all of which were on top of high peaks. Nevertheless, the strength of the fortification impressed the Mongols, who surveyed them from various angles to find a weak point.
Since the winter was approaching, Hülegü was advised by the majority of his lieutenants to postpone the siege, but he decided to proceed.  Preliminary bombardments were performed for three days by mangonels from a nearby hilltop with casualties on both sides. A direct Mongol assault on the fourth day was repulsed. The Mongols then used heavier siege engines hurling javelins dipped in burning pitch and set up additional mangonels all around the fortifications.

Later that month, Kuhrshah sent a message offering his surrender on the condition of the immunity of him and his family. Hülegü's royal decree was sent by Ata-Malik Juvayni, who took it personally to Khurshah, asking for his signature, but Khurshah was hesitant. After several days, Hülegü began another bombardment and on 19 November, Khurshah and his entourage descended from the fortress and surrendered. The evacuation of the fortress continued until the next day. A small part of the garrison refused to surrender and fought in a last stand in a high domed building in the fortress; they were defeated and slaughtered after three days.

The Nizaris' leadership decision to surrender was apparently influenced by outside scholars such as al-Tusi.

An inexplicable aspect of the events for historians is why Alamut made no effort to assist their besieged comrades in Maymun-Diz.

Capitulation of Alamut

Khurshah instructed all Nizari castles of the Rusbar valley to capitulate, evacuate, and dismantle their forts. All castles (around forty) subsequently capitulated, except Alamut (under sipahsalar Muqaddam al-Din Muhammad Mubariz) and Lambsar, possibly because their commanders thought the Imam issued orders under duress and was practicing a sort of taqiyya. Despite the small size of the fortress and its garrison, Alamut was stone-built (unlike Maymun-Diz), well-provisioned, and featured a reliable water supply. However, the Nizari faith demands the faithful absolute obedience to the Imam in all circumstances. Hülegü surrounded Alamut with his army, and Khurshah unsuccessfully attempted to persuade its commander to surrender. Hülegü left a large force under Balaghai to besiege Alamut, and himself together with Khurshah set out to besiege the nearby Lambsar. Muqaddam al-Din eventually capitulated after a few days in December 1256.

Juvayni describes the difficulty by which the Mongols dismantled the plastered walls and lead-covered ramparts of Alamut. The Mongols had to set fire to the buildings and then destroy them piece by piece. He also notes the extensive chambers, galleries, and deep tanks, replete with wine, vinegar, honey, and other goods. During the pillage, one man was almost drowned in a honey store.

After examining Alamut's famous library, Juvayni saved "copies of the Qur'an and other choice books" as well as "astronomical instruments such as kursis (part of an astrolabe), armillary spheres, complete and partial astrolabes, and others", and burned the other books "which related to their heresy and error". He also picked Hasan Sabbah's biography, Sargudhasht-i Bābā Sayyidinā, which interested him, but he claims he burnt it after reading it. He has extensively cited its contents in his Tarikh-i Jahangushay.

Juvayni has noted the impregnability and self-sufficiency of Alamut and other Nizari fortresses. Rashid al-Din similarly writes of the good fortune of Mongols in their war against the Nizaris.

Massacres of the Nizaris and aftermath

By 1256, Hülegü almost eliminated the Persian Nizaris as an independent military force. Khurshah was then taken to Qazvin where he sent messages to the Syrian Nizari stronghold instructing them to surrender, but they did not act, believing that the Imam was acting under duress. As his position became intolerable, Khurshah asked Hülegü to be allowed to go meet Möngke in Mongolia, promising that he would persuade the remaining Ismaili fortresses to surrender. Möngke rebuked him after visiting him in Karakoram, Mongolia, due to his failure to hand over Lambsar and Gerdkuh, and ordered his return to his homeland. In the way, he and his small retinue were executed by their Mongol escort. Möngke meanwhile issued a general massacre of all Nizari Ismailis, including all of Khurshah's family as well as the garrisons. Khurshah's relatives who were kept at Qazvin were killed by Qaraqai Bitikchi, while Ötegü-China summoned the Nizaris of Quhistan to gatherings and slaughtered about 12,000 people. Möngke's order reflects an earlier order by Chingiz Khan. Around 100,000 people are estimated to have been killed.

Hülegü then moved with the bulk of his army to Azerbaijan, officially established his own khanate (the Ilkhanate), and then sacked Baghdad in 1258.

As the centralized government of the Nizaris was disestablished, the Nizaris either were killed or had abandoned their traditional strongholds. Many of them migrated to Afghanistan, Badakhshan, and Sindh. Little is known about the history of the Ismailis in this stage, until two centuries later, when they again began to grow as scattered communities under regional da'is in Iran, Afghanistan, Badakhshan, Syria, and India. The Nizaris of Syria were tolerated by the Bahri Mamluks and held a few castles under Mamluk suzerainty. The Mamluks may have employed Nizari fedais against their own enemies, notably the attempted assassination of the Crusading Prince Edward of England in 1271.

Resistance by Nizaris in Persia was still ongoing in some forts, notably Lambsar, Gerdkuh, and several forts in Quhistan. Lambsar fell in January 1257 after a cholera outbreak. Gerdkuh resisted much longer. The Mongols had built permanent structures and houses around this fortress, the ruins of which, together with two types of stones used for Nizari and Mongol mangonels, still remains today. On 15 December 1270, during the reign of Abaqa, the garrison of Gerdkuh surrendered from want of clothing. It was thirteen years after the fall of Alamut, and seventeen years after its first siege by Kitbuqa; the Mongols killed the surviving garrison but did not destroy the fortress. In the same year, an unsuccessful assassination attempt of Juvayni is attributed to the Nizaris, who had earlier spoken of their total annihilation. By 1273, all Syrian Nizari castles were also captured by Baibars.

In 1275, a Nizari force under a son of Khurshah (titled Naw Dawlat or Abu Dawlat) and a descendant of the Khwarezmian dynasty recaptured the Alamut Castle, but the Mongols reclaimed it a year later. Just like other groups in the nearby regions, the Nizaris too were still able to retain a (semi)-independent state in their heartland of Daylam. This continued at least until Öljaitü's campaign against Gilan in 1307, which was successful but was a pyrrhic victory with heavy casualties on both sides. Nevertheless, the possible Ilkhanate authority over the region must have been eradicated in 1335 after the death of the last ruler of the Ilkhanate. By 1368, Daylam was governed by Kiya Sayf al-Din, a member of the Kushaijis, an Ismaili dynasty. He was attacked and killed by Sayyid Ali Kiya, the founder of the Karkiya dynasty. The Nizaris also re-established their Imamate at the village of Anjudan, where they are recorded to be active in the 14–15th century.

References

Further reading
 

Invasions by the Mongol Empire
Invasions of Iran
Nizari Ismaili state
Wars involving the Nizari Ismaili state
Sieges involving the Mongol Empire
Sieges involving Iran
13th-century Islam
1255 beginnings
Conflicts in 1253
Conflicts in 1256
1256 in the Mongol Empire
1256 disestablishments in Asia
Conflicts in 1270
Conflicts in 1275
Conflicts in 1276
13th century in Iran
1251 in the Mongol Empire
1253 in the Mongol Empire
Tabaristan
Medieval Khorasan
History of South Khorasan Province
History of Razavi Khorasan Province
History of Semnan Province
History of Qazvin Province
History of Tehran Province
Massacres in Iran
Prisoner of war massacres
Politicides
Anti-Ismailism
Religious massacres